Ormyrus is a genus of chalcid wasps in the family Ormyridae. There are at least 120 described species in Ormyrus.

See also
 List of Ormyrus species

References

Further reading

External links

 

Parasitic wasps
Chalcidoidea